Stella was a French bicycle manufacturer founded in 1909. The company sponsored Louison Bobet, a French professional cyclist. Bobet won the Tour de France in 1953 and 1954 while riding Stella bicycles.

Trivia
Stella became the codename for the Atari 2600 because Jay Miner (the video chip designer) owned a Stella bicycle.

References

Cycle manufacturers of France